The Tibetan People's Republic or Bodpa People's Republic, officially known as the Chinese Soviet Central Bodpa Autonomous Government (Tibetan: བོད་པའི་སྡེ་པ, Wylie: bod pa'i sde pa) was a short-lived contingent of the Northwest Chinese Soviet Federation established on May 5, 1936. It was a Tibetan autonomous government under the Chinese Communist Party established by the Chinese Red Army during the Long March to assist local Tibetans in Dawu County, Luhuo County, Yajiang County and Garzê County.

Its main operations were located in the tusi chiefdom of Derge (now Dêgê County). Key people involved with the republic included Spommdav Rdorje, Bkrashis Dbangphyug, and others. The Republic was dissolved along with the Northwest Soviet Federation following the convening of the Chinese 2nd and 4th Army in Garzê County.

References 

History of Tibet
1936 in China
1936 establishments in China
1936 disestablishments in China
Chinese Civil War
Former socialist republics
Former countries in Chinese history
Former countries in East Asia
Soviet republics
Former countries of the interwar period
Chinese Soviet Republic